New York State Route 158 (NY 158) is a state highway in New York, running from near the Albany County village of Altamont to the Schenectady County town of Rotterdam, just outside Schenectady. NY 158 is a two-lane highway for all of its length.

Route description

NY 158 proceeds winding north alongside the Black Creek as a two-lane road through several residences, crossing over the Bozen Kill. Now paralleling the Bozen Kill, the route continues north through Guiderland as the waterway merges into the Watervilet Reservoir. At the northern end of the reservoir, NY 158 intersects with US 20 (Western Avenue). After US 20, the route continues north through Guiderland, winding through town as it gains the moniker of Guiderland Avenue. In the hamlet of Parkers Corners, NY 158 continues past some residences and an intersection with Old State Road. A short trek to the north and NY 158 crosses the line from Albany County to Schenectady County.

NY 158, now in the town of Rotterdam, continues north into the hamlet of Pine Grove as Guiderland Avenue. In Pine Grove, NY 158 bends northeast at a junction with the eastern terminus of NY 406 (Giffords Church Road). Crossing over a railroad line, the road passes a small housing complex before crossing under the New York State Thruway (I-90). After the Thruway, NY 158 enters the hamlet of Rotterdam, where Guiderland Avenue becomes a two-lane residential street. Crossing over another railroad grade, NY 158 turns north at Sunrise Boulevard. Just five blocks to the north of Sunrise, Guiderland Avenue intersects with NY 7 (Curry Road). This intersection serves as the northern terminus of NY 158 while the route continues north as County Route 160.

History
NY 158 was assigned as part of the 1930 renumbering of state highways in New York. It initially began at NY 146 east of Altamont in Guilderland and followed its modern alignment north to Curry Road (now NY 7) in Rotterdam. From there, it continued north along Guilderland Avenue into Schenectady, where it ended at Broadway (then-NY 7). NY 7 was realigned  to bypass downtown Schenectady on Curry Road. At the same time, NY 158 was truncated southward to end at the rerouted NY 7. The former alignment of NY 158 between Curry Road and the Schenectady city line remained state-maintained as a reference route until April 1, 1980, when ownership and maintenance of the highway was transferred from the state of New York to Schenectady County as part of a highway maintenance swap between the two levels of government. It was subsequently designated as County Route 160 by Schenectady County.

Major intersections

See also

List of county routes in Schenectady County, New York

References

External links

158
Transportation in Albany County, New York
Transportation in Schenectady County, New York